Parmeshwar Narayan Haksar (4 September 1913 – 25 November 1998) was an Indian bureaucrat and diplomat, best known for his two-year stint as Prime Minister Indira Gandhi's principal secretary (1971–73). In that role, Haksar was the chief strategist and policy adviser behind his inexperienced prime minister's rise to near-absolute power in the mid-1970s. After this he was appointed deputy chairman of the Planning Commission and then the first-ever chancellor of New Delhi's Jawaharlal Nehru University.

An advocate of centralisation and socialism, he was a Kashmiri Pandit who became Gandhi's closest confidant in her inner coterie of bureaucrats, the so-called "Kashmiri mafia". Prior to this, Haksar was a diplomat of the Indian Foreign Service, who served as India's ambassador to Austria and Nigeria.

Personal life
Haksar was born in 1913, Gujranwala (now in Pakistan) in a Kashmiri Pandit family. He studied Sanskrit at home and obtained an M.Sc. from University of Allahabad, Uttar Pradesh. He went on to study in the London School of Economics. Critics say he was far too close to Soviet ideology. As a student of Allahabad university, he was a resident of Mayo Hall and made frequent visits to the Anand Bhawan, the house of Motilal Nehru. Parmeshwar was a voracious reader of art history and also a connoisseur of paintings. During his interlude in London as a student, he was influenced by Fabian socialism and later become associated with Marxists.

During the latter years of his life, Haksar became associated with the Delhi Science Forum, initiatives on human rights, and opposition to  neo-liberal policies and secularism. He lost his eyesight during the last 10 years of his life when the only pleasure he allowed himself was a weekly massage. Haksar died at the age of 85, on 25 November 1998.

Career

Early career
Haksar had already made his mark as a prominent lawyer in Allahabad, before he was selected in the Indian Foreign Service in 1947, and was close to fellow-Kashmiri from Allahabad Jawaharlal Nehru, the latter who would go on to become independent India's first prime minister. A one-time student at the London School of Economics, he was a junior colleague of V. K. Krishna Menon at the India League in London.Critics say he was arrogant, occasionally vindictive, uncomfortably close to Soviet thinking and a willing tool of Moscow.

Civil services
P. N. Haksar served as the India ambassador to Nigeria and Austria. In the 1960s, he also served as a deputy high commissioner in London. After twenty years in the Indian foreign service, he was appointed an aide to the then prime minister, Indira Gandhi. In 1967, he replaced L. K. Jha as Secretary to the Prime Minister of India, and was promoted to the newly created post of Principal Secretary to the Prime Minister of India in 1971, thus becoming the most powerful senior civil servant in the prime minister's office.In total he served for six years as India's most powerful civil servant. He authored the 'Stray Thoughts Memorandum' at the Congress Working Committee meeting in Bangalore which ultimately led to the defenestration of her political rivals such as like Morarji Desai. Until he vacated the position of Principal Secretary to Indira Gandhi, Haksar exercised significant influence on the formulation of domestic and foreign policies in Raisina Hill. As Principal Secretary, Haksar fashioned Indira Gandhi's decision about the timing and level of support to be given to Bangladeshi freedom struggle, issuing directives from her private office to the top military leadership in some cases. The Prime Minister and her Principal Secretary subsequently fell out because Haksar despised Indira's poorly educated and lacklustre younger son, Sanjay, who aspired to be his mother's successor. It was Sanjay who authorised a police raid on the Haksar family's shop in New Delhi, Pandit Brothers, deliberately humiliating the civil servant. Haksar never forgave Indira. When she returned to power for the second time in 1980, she pleaded with him to resume his former role. To his credit Haksar stood his ground and refused, even at the risk of being persecuted.

Administrator and strategist
Haksar was noted for his strategising on the nationalisation of banks, insurance firms and foreign-owned oil companies, the 1971 Indo-Soviet Treaty and India's support to the liberation of what would become Bangladesh. He is also the chief architect of the Shimla Agreement with Pakistan, as he was of the creation of the Research and Analysis Wing (R&AW), India's foreign secret intelligence agency

Refusal of Padma Vibhushan
Upon his retirement from the civil service in 1973, Indira Gandhi offered Haksar India's second highest civilian honour, the Padma Vibhushan, for his numerous distinguished services to India; however, in a letter to Govind Narain he declined the honour stating that "Accepting an award for work done somehow causes an inexplicable discomfort to me." The prime minister duly rescinded her offer.

Books

Premonitions (1979)
Reflections on our Times (1982)
One more Life (1990)
Genesis of Indo-Pakistan Conflict on Kashmir
Haksar Memorial Vol-1Contemplations on the Human Condition
Haksar Memorial Vol-2 Contribution in Remembrance
Haksar Memorial Vol-3 Challenge for Nation Building in a world in turmoil
Nehru's Vision of Peace and Security in Nuclear Age
Studies in Indo-Soviet Relations

References

External links
K. R. Narayanan: Speech in memory of P. N. Haksar; 7 January 1999
Ashok Mitra: The P. N. Haksar story

Haksar, P. N.
Haksar, P. N.
Haksar, P. N.
Haksar, P. N.
University of Allahabad alumni
Alumni of the London School of Economics
Scholars from Allahabad
20th-century Indian lawyers
Haskar, P. N.